Patio Santa Fe, original name Gran Patio Santa Fe, is a  vertical power center in Santa Fe, Mexico City. It is nine stories tall anchored by Walmart, Sam's Club, The Home Depot, Office Depot, Petco, a Sportium gym, Cinépolis 16-screen multicinema, and a  glass-covered rooftop park. It has approximately 130 retail shops, 25 restaurants including Red Lobster, Toks, and IHOP, and 2,800 parking spaces.

External links
Official Web page (Facebook)

References

Shopping malls in Greater Mexico City
Cuajimalpa